The 2013 Seguros Bolívar Open Pereira was a professional tennis tournament played on clay courts. It was the third edition of the tournament which was part of the 2013 ATP Challenger Tour. It took place in Pereira, Colombia between 25 March and 31 March 2013.

Singles main draw entrants

Seeds

 1 Rankings are as of March 18, 2013.

Other entrants
The following players received wildcards into the singles main draw:
  Juan Sebastián Cabal
  Felipe Escobar
  Paolo Lorenzi
  Eduardo Struvay

The following players received entry as an alternate into the singles main draw:
  Toni Androić

The following players received entry from the qualifying draw:
  Iván Endara
  Federico Gaio
  Jozef Kovalík
  David Souto

Doubles main draw entrants

Seeds

1 Rankings as of March 18, 2013.

Other entrants
The following pairs received wildcards into the doubles main draw:
  Sam Barnett /  Kevin Kim
  Nicolás Barrientos /  Eduardo Struvay
  Felipe Escobar /  Carlos Salamanca

Champions

Singles

 Santiago Giraldo def.  Paul Capdeville, 6–2, 6–4

Doubles

 Nicolás Barrientos /  Eduardo Struvay def.  Facundo Bagnis /  Federico Delbonis, 3–6, 6–3, [10–6]

External links
 Official Website

Seguros Bolivar Open Pereira
Seguros Bolívar Open Pereira
2013 in Colombian tennis